Channel 39, also known as Southern Television (and formerly Dunedin Television and Channel 9), is a regional television station operating in Dunedin, New Zealand. The channel is a division of Allied Press, who also publish the local daily newspaper Otago Daily Times.

History
Channel 39 first commenced transmission in 1995 as a tourism station. In 1997 the station was expanded into a news-carrying local station called Channel 9. In 2003, the channel underwent a reorientation of strategy to focus on local news and became a division of Allied Press.

In March 2013, Channel 9 was rebranded as Dunedin Television when New Zealand switched to digital television. In addition, the channel's broadcast channel was changed to Freeview HD Channel 39. The station's chief executive Daryl Clarkson said that company had chosen the name Channel 39 "because it included the number nine and would hold the heritage of Channel 9." Channel 39 also entered into partnerships with local organisations including the Dunedin City Council. On 1 September 2016, Channel 39 extended its coverage to include Invercargill and adopted the name "Southern Television."

Between 24 March 1981 and 9 September 2016, the channel's owner Allied Press had registered the name Southern Television as an incorporated subsidiary with the New Zealand Companies Office.

Facilities
As a division of Allied Press, Channel 39 has an office at the company's headquarters in Stuart Street and also operates a branch office in Invercargill. The channel operates a live-to-air studio and small production house. They also produce commercials and short programmes. Channel 39 also works with outside broadcast facilities to facilitate the broadcast of local and sporting events in Dunedin and Invercargill.

Live events
39 Southern Television has an Outside Broadcast unit. The purpose built van provides flexibility to cover local events live on air from various locations around Dunedin. The Outside Broadcast (OB) facility has been built by technical staff at Allied Press and was first used to broadcast the Dunedin Santa Parade live on television on  December 4, 2005.

The mobile unit is fitted out as a purpose built portable studio complete with digital video mixer, graphics capability, sound and editing facilities. It can also accommodate up to six cameras, and be run single handed or with multiple crews. The unit can be powered by 240 volts or run from its own self-contained power supply for maximum flexibility.

Local programmes

39 Southern Television provides a 24-hour schedule and provides a core of locally focused primetime viewing. The programming includes its flagship locally produced The South Today, Southern Newsweek, Dunedin Diary, Scarfie Land, Southern Attractions, local sports and event coverage as well as programming from local, national and international partners.

The South Today
The South Today is a half-hour live television news that is broadcast daily at 5:30pm, with repeat transmissions at 7pm and 9:30pm. 
The programme is funded by New Zealand On Air.

Southern Newsweek
Southern Newsweek is a roundup of the weeks news from Dunedin. It consists of stories from the weekly news broadcasts.

Dunedin Diary
Dunedin Diary is a weekly current affairs, lifestyle and arts magazine show hosted by veteran TVNZ 1 broadcaster Dougal Stevenson.

Scarfie Land
Scarfie Land was a showcase of student life in Dunedin with its roots are derived from COW (Campus Otago Weekly) TV. From 2015, it was replaced by a Facebook updates page. Broadcaster Clarke Gayford, who is the partner of New Zealand Prime Minister Jacinda Ardern pitched the COW TV to the station after graduating from the New Zealand Graduate School.

Sports
Channel 39's sports programme covers a range of sporting activities including rugby, football, ice hockey, cricket, motorsports cars and bikes.

Southern Attractions
Southern Attractions is a tourism programme aimed at visitors to Dunedin and the surrounding region. It runs from 7.39am to 10am, 3pm to 4pm, and from 6pm to 7pm on weekdays. It also runs at various times over the weekends.

Former content

Story Time
Storytime was a half-hour show hosted by Anita Cumming (who also briefly appeared in TVNZ's Shortland Street) and Merlin the Mouse aimed at preschoolers and young children.

References

External links
 
 Allied Press (parent company)

Allied Press
English-language television stations in New Zealand
Mass media in Dunedin
Television channels and stations established in 1995